The 40th Air Refueling Squadron is an inactive United States Air Force unit. It was last assigned to the 310th Strategic Aerospace Wing at Schilling Air Force Base, Kansas, where it was inactivated on 15 March 1963.  The squadron's first predecessor is the 540th Bombardment Squadron, which served as a heavy bomber training unit during World War II until inactivating in a 1944 reorganization of Army Air Forces training units.  The 40th Squadron was activated at Schilling in 1952 and performed worldwide refueling missions until inactivated.

History

World War II bomber training

The first predecessor of the squadron was the 540th Bombardment Squadron, which was activated at Salt Lake City Army Air Base, Utah as one of the four original squadrons of the 383d Bombardment Group.  Its cadre moved to Rapid City Army Air Base a little over a week later, where it began to equip as a Boeing B-17 Flying Fortress Operational Training Unit (OTU) the following year. OTUs were oversized parent units that provided cadres to "satellite groups"

In October 1943, the squadron moved to Peterson Field, Colorado, where it flew Consolidated B-24 Liberator and changed its mission to become a Replacement Training Unit (RTU).  Like OTUs, RTUs were oversized units, but their mission was to train individual aircrews. However, the AAF was finding that standard military units like the 540th, which were based on relatively inflexible tables of organization were not well adapted to the training mission.  Accordingly, it adopted a more functional system in which each base was organized into a separate numbered unit, which was manned and equipped for the specific training mission. As a result, the 383d Group, its elements and supporting units were inactivated or disbanded and replaced by the 214th AAF Base Unit (Combat Crew Training School, Heavy), which was simultaneously organized at Peterson.

Air refueling operations
The squadron's second predecessor was activated in July 1952 at Smoky Hill Air Force Base and assigned to the 40th Bombardment Wing. The squadron remained a paper unit and did not become operational until 8 September 1952.  Because its parent wing remained unmanned, the squadron was attached to the 310th Bombardment Wing until 30 April 1953.

SAC had begun to include refueling in its war plans, and the squadron made frequent deployments with its KC-97s to forward locations, placing it ahead of the faster Boeing B-47 Stratojets it would refuel, and on their programmed route, as part of Operation Reflex.  Reflex placed Boeing B-47 Stratojets and KC-97s at bases closer to the Soviet Union for 90-day periods, although individuals rotated back to home bases during unit Reflex deployments During Operation Reflex deployments with the wing, the squadron's aircraft also served as transports, carrying extra air crew, support personnel, and spare parts. The percentage of Strategic Air Command (SAC) planes on alert gradually grew over the next three years to reach its goal of 1/3 of SAC's force on alert by 1960.

In 1960, the 40th Wing moved to Forbes Air Force Base, Kansas.  The squadron remained behind and was reassigned to the 310th Bombardment Wing.  During the Cuban Missile Crisis, on 24 October SAC went to DEFCON 2, placing all its aircraft on alert. On 29 October, additional KC-97s were dispersed to forward locations to provide refueling for B-47s on increased alert status. Dispersed B-47s and supporting tankers were recalled to their home bases on 24 November and on 27 November, SAC returned to normal alert posture. The squadron became nonoperational on 1 January 1963 and was inactivated in March 1963 as part of the phaseout of the KC-97 from SAC.

Consolidation
On 19 September 1985, the 40th Air Refueling Squadron was consolidated with the 540th Bombardment Squadron, but the consolidated unit has not been active.

Lineage
 540th Bombardment Squadron
 Constituted as the 540th Bombardment Squadron (Heavy) on 28 October 1942
 Activated on 3 November 1942
 Inactivated on 1 April 1944
 Consolidated with the 40th Air Refueling Squadron as the 40th Air Refueling Squadron on 19 September 1985

 40th Air Refueling Squadron
 Constituted as the 40th Air Refueling Squadron, Medium on 18 June 1952
 Activated on 8 July 1952
 Discontinued on 15 March 1963
 Consolidated with the 540th Bombardment Squadron on 19 September 1985

Assignments
 383d Bombardment Group, 3 November 1942 – 1 April 1944
 40th Bombardment Wing, 8 July 1952 (attached to 310th Bombardment Wing, 8 September 1952 – 30 April 1953, detached 1–10 March 1954, 4 May–27 June 1954, 25 June–5 September 1956, c. 1 July–c. 1 October 1957, c. 1 October 1958 – 10 January 1959)
 310th Bombardment Wing (later 310th Strategic Aerospace Wing), 1 June 1960 – 15 March 1963

Stations
 Salt Lake City Army Air Base, Utah, 3 November 1942
 Rapid City Army Air Base, South Dakota, 12 November 1942
 Ainsworth Army Air Field, Nebraska, 13 December 1942
 Rapid City Army Air Base, South Dakota, 26 April 1943
 Geiger Field, Washington, 20 June 1943
 Peterson Field, Colorado, c. 26 October 1943 – 1 April 1944
 Smoky Hill Air Force Base (later Schilling Air Force Base), Kansas, 8 July 1952 – 15 March 1963

Aircraft
 Boeing B-17 Flying Fortress, 1943
 Consolidated B-24 Liberator, 1943–1944
 Boeing KC-97 Stratofreighter, 1953–1964

Campaigns

See also
 List of United States Air Force air refueling squadrons
 B-24 Liberator units of the United States Army Air Forces
 B-17 Flying Fortress units of the United States Army Air Forces

Notes

References

Bibliography

 
 
 
 
  
 
 
 

040
Units and formations of Strategic Air Command
Military units and formations established in 1952